The Borač Castle was a noble court and one of the largest and most important fortified towns of medieval Bosnia, situated on top of rugged slopes high above the Prača river canyon, between Mesići and Brčigovo village, near modern days Rogatica town, in Bosnia and Herzegovina. Fortified castle was a seat of the Pavlović noble family.

Old and New structure
The family hailed and ruled from Borač. It is the first of two castles in their possession, which family used as a seat. Two castles were built in space of several decades and within few kilometers  from each other, the second being Pavlovac, sometimes called New Borač or New Town.

Pavlovac
The new castle or New Town or New Borač is actually called Pavlovac, and is considered to be a new structure, also known simply as Novi or Novi Grad, situated on top of rugged slopes above the Prača river canyon, near modern days Prača village, in Bosnia and Herzegovina. Problem exist in correct dating of its construction, but some medieval charters suggest 1392, or late 14th century, as time of its construction, during Radislav Pavlović at the family's helm.

Old Borač

See also

Pavlovac (fortress)
Radinović-Pavlović
List of fortifications in Bosnia and Herzegovina

References

b
b